is a Japanese football player. He plays for Oita Trinita.

Career
Junya Nodake joined J3 League club Kagoshima United FC in 2017.

Club statistics
Updated to 22 February 2018.

References

External links
Profile at Kagoshima United FC

1994 births
Living people
Fukuoka University alumni
Association football people from Kagoshima Prefecture
Japanese footballers
J1 League players
J2 League players
J3 League players
Kagoshima United FC players
Oita Trinita players
Association football forwards
People from Kagoshima